R346 road may refer to:
 R346 road (Ireland)
 R346 road (South Africa)